The Radio Disney Music Award for Fiercest Fans was first introduced in 2013. Initially titled So FANtastic –  Fiercest Fans, the award was later shortened to Fiercest Fans as of the 2015 edition. Nominees and winners are determined solely through fan votes cast via Radio Disney's official website, as well as on Facebook and Twitter.

Winners and nominees

2010s

References

Fiercest Fans